Salceo is one of thirteen parishes (administrative divisions) in Quirós, a municipality within the province and autonomous community of the Principality of Asturias, in northern Spain.

The population is 112 (INE 2011).

Villages

References 

Parishes in Quirós